The domed octagonal Lateran Baptistery stands somewhat apart from the Archbasilica of Saint John Lateran, Rome, to which it has become joined by later construction. This baptistery was founded by Pope Sixtus III in 440, perhaps on an earlier structure, for a legend grew up that Constantine the Great had been baptized there and enriched the structure. However, it is more likely that if he was baptized it was in the Eastern part of the Roman Empire and possibly by an Arian bishop. This baptistry was for many generations the only baptistery in Rome, and its octagonal structure, centered upon the large octagonal basin for full immersions, provided a model for others throughout Italy, and even an iconic motif of illuminated manuscripts, "The fountain of Life".

Around the central area, where is the basin of the font, an octagon is formed by eight porphyry columns, with marble Corinthian capitals and entablature of classical form. On the ceiling of the Baptistry is the story of the Battle of the Milvian Bridge (312 AD). An ambulatory surrounds the font and outer walls form a larger octagon. Attached to one side, towards the Lateran Basilica, is a fine porch with two porphyry columns and richly carved capitals, bases and entablatures.

The Baptistery was subject to an elaborate restoration during the pontificate of Pope Urban VIII. While its interior architecture was consolidated and embellished after plans of Gian Lorenzo Bernini, a fresco cycle with scenes from the life of Constantine was added by Andrea Sacchi on the walls of the ambulatory. In the meantime the early Christian liturgy of Easter baptisms was reanimated by the Baroque popes, baptizing adult "turchi ed ebrei" ("Turks and Jews") in a public ceremony on Easter eve. Its plain brick exterior was later on embellished with a frieze designed by Francesco Borromini in 1657, incorporating the arms of Pope Alexander VII.

See also
Lateran Obelisk
History of Roman and Byzantine domes

External links

Battisterio Lateranense; based on Giuseppe Vasi's engravings and his Itinerario 1761.
High-resolution 360° Panoramas and Images of Lateran Baptistery | Art Atlas
Interactive Nolli Map Website

Citations

Catholic baptisteries
Roman Catholic churches in Rome
Ancient Roman buildings and structures in Rome
5th-century churches
Octagonal churches in Italy
Baptisteries in Italy